Xyrias chioui is an eel in the family Ophichthidae (worm/snake eels). It was described by John E. McCosker, Chen Wei-Li and Chen Hong-Ming in 2009. It is a marine, subtropical eel which is known from Taiwan, in the Pacific Ocean. It generally dwells at a depth range of 60–70 meters. Males can reach a maximum total length of 81.9 centimeters.

The species epithet "chioui" was given in honour of Captain Jiun-Shiun Chiou, who is credited with donating the type specimen of X. chioui, as well as other eel specimens of significance, to the National Taiwan Ocean University.

References

Ophichthidae
Fish described in 2009